Bernard Hall (born January 16, 1967) is a former American football player who played two seasons with the St. Louis Stampede of the Arena Football League. He played college football at Central State University.

References

External links
Just Sports Stats

Living people
1967 births
American football fullbacks
American football linebackers
African-American players of American football
Central State Marauders football players
St. Louis Stampede players
21st-century African-American people
20th-century African-American sportspeople